David Tennant (born 1971) is a Scottish actor.

David Tennant may also refer to:

David Tennant (aristocrat) (1902–1968), founder of the Gargoyle Club
David Tennant (politician) (1829–1905), Cape Colony politician
Dave Tennant (born 1945), English football goalkeeper (Walsall FC, Lincoln City, Rochdale AFC)

See also
Tennant (surname)